Collie or Colly may mean:

Dogs
Collie, an old type and breed of herding dog originating in the United Kingdom; the ancestor of numerous breeds and types, some (but not all) typically include the name of “collie" :
 Shetland Sheepdog (Sheltie; also sometimes referred to as a Miniature Collie or Toy Collie; the Sheltie descends primarily from the Collie, and includes Pomeranian, King Charles Spaniel (not the Cavalier King Charles Spaniel) and the extinct Yakki Dog.  A miniature breed standing about 14-16 inches at the shoulder.  A popular pet and show dog, they also excel as obedience and agility trial dogs.  
Bearded Collie, a type of collie that looks somewhat like an Old  English sheepdog.
Border Collie, a collie type from the Border area of Scotland and Northern England, the most widespread herding dog
German Collie or German Koolie/Coolie, Australian Koolie, an Australian breed of herding dog probably derived from German working breeds and Collies
Scotch Collie, one of the most common names for what is now commonly called the Collie.  They consist of two types:
Rough Collie, long-haired, made famous by the Lassie films
Smooth Collie, short-haired
Welsh Collie or Welsh Sheepdog, a landrace herding dog from Wales

Places 
Colly (hill), An Bheann Mhór, a 679 m mountain in Kerry, Ireland
Collie, New South Wales, a village and parish in Australia
Collie, Western Australia, a town in Australia
Collie River, a river in Western Australia
Shire of Collie, a local government area in the South West region of Western Australia
Mount Collie, a mountain in Yoho National Park, Canada
Colly Township, North Carolina, a district in North Carolina, United States

People 
Collie (name), a list of people with the surname, given name or nickname
Collie Buddz (Colin Harper, born 1981), reggae and dancehall artist from Bermuda

Other uses 
Operation Collie, a British Second World War naval operation in the Pacific
Collie, a slang term for cannabis (drug)
Collie's Squirrel (Sciurus colliaei), a Mexican species of squirrel
Collie Street, Fremantle, Western Australia

See also
Coley (surname)
Coll
Coll (disambiguation)
Colley (disambiguation)
Longus colli muscle